Abraham Kurland (10 June 1912 – 14 March 1999) was a Danish Olympic silver medalist wrestler.  Kurland won 12 Denmark championships from 1932-49, won a silver medal in lightweight Greco Roman wrestling at the 1932 Olympics and a gold medal in lightweight at the 1932 Maccabiah Games in Mandatory Palestine, won a gold medal at the 1934 European Wrestling Championships in Greco-Roman and a bronze medal in freestyle, and won a silver medal at the 1935 European Wrestling Championships. 

Kurland was the favorite to win a gold medal at the 1936 Olympics. However, he declined to participate because it was taking place in Nazi Germany.

Biography
Kurland was Jewish, and was born in Odense, Syddanmark, Denmark. 

He was affiliated with the Hakoah Jewish Sports Club, København/Bagsværd.

In 1928, at 16 years of age, Kurland became Hakoah's first Copenhagen bantamweight champion.

Kurland won 12 Denmark championships from 1932-49.

He won a silver medal in lightweight Greco Roman wrestling at the 1932 Olympics in Los Angeles, at 20 years of age, after being narrowly defeated for the gold medal.

At the 1932 Maccabiah Games in Mandatory Palestine, Kurland won a gold medal in the lightweight category.

At the 1934 European Wrestling Championships Kurland won a gold medal in Greco-Roman, and a bronze medal in freestyle.  At the 1935 European Wrestling Championships he won a silver medal in Greco-Roman. 

Kurland was the favorite to win a gold medal at the 1936 Olympics. However, he declined to participate because it was taking place in Nazi Germany.

In 1943 during World War II, Kurland fled to Sweden on a fishing boat from Gilleleje to Hoganas with a group Danish-Jewish wrestlers, and they stayed with the families of Swedish wrestlers. 

In 1945 he returned to Denmark. Kurland worked there as a coach from 1948-62.

After the war, at the 1948 Olympics in London, Kurland competed in lightweight Greco Roman wrestling at 36 years of age, and came in ninth.

See also
 List of select Jewish wrestlers
List of Olympic medalists in Greco-Roman wrestling
List of 1932 Summer Olympics medal winners

References

External links
 
 Danmarks Brydeforbund Mesterskabsdatabase Abraham Kurland

1912 births
1999 deaths
Danish male sport wrestlers
European Wrestling Champions
European Wrestling Championships medalists
Jewish wrestlers
Jewish Danish sportspeople
Maccabiah Games gold medalists
Maccabiah Games medalists in wrestling
Maccabiah Games competitors by country
Competitors at the 1932 Maccabiah Games
Medalists at the 1932 Summer Olympics
Olympic medalists in wrestling
Olympic silver medalists for Denmark
Olympic wrestlers of Denmark
Wrestlers at the 1932 Summer Olympics
Wrestlers at the 1948 Summer Olympics
Sportspeople from Odense